Air Adriatic was a charter airline based in Rijeka, Croatia and was the first private Croatian airline. It operated charter services from northern Europe to Croatian holiday destinations. Its main bases were Pula Airport and Dubrovnik Airport. It ceased operations in March 2007 after it had lost its air operator certificate.

History
The airline was established in October 2001 and started operations in March 2002.

It had its headquarters at Rijeka and technical operations based at Pula Airport. In 2004, charters were largely flown between Sweden and Croatia. In 2005, the company bought three additional used McDonnell Douglas MD-82 aircraft from Alitalia. In September 2006, the airline was planning to launch scheduled services and was considering adding Boeing 757-200s to its fleet.

Air Adriatic announced plans for 2007 to launch schedule services from Zagreb to Berlin, Düsseldorf, Malmö, Moscow, Pristina, Skopje and Zürich and to replace its McDonnell Douglas MD-82s with Boeing 737-700 aircraft. It also wet-leased one of its MD-82s to MyAir. Air Adriatic ceased operations in March 2007.

Adria Wings has been established by former Air Adriatic employees and was expected to resume charter operations with a single McDonnell Douglas MD-83 aircraft, but it folded before starting any service.

Fleet

The Air Adriatic fleet included the following aircraft (at March 2007) :

4 McDonnell Douglas MD-82

Previously operated
The airline also operated:
1 McDonnell Douglas MD-83
1 Tupolev Tu-154

As of 3 June 2008, the average age of the Air Adriatic fleet is 21.6 years.

References

External links

Descriptif compagnie Air Adriatic

Defunct airlines of Croatia
Airlines established in 2001
Airlines disestablished in 2007
2007 disestablishments in Croatia
Croatian companies established in 2001